The Brain Function Laboratory at Yale University School of Medicine "aims to understand the neural circuitry and fundamental mechanisms of the brain that enable human cognition, language, emotion, decision making, and perception in both healthy/typical individuals and patients with neurological, developmental, and psychiatric disorders."

The Brain Function Laboratory was established at Yale University in 2013 under the direction of Joy Hirsch following a transition from the fMRI Research Center within the Program for Imaging & Cognitive Sciences (PICS) also directed by Lawrence Hirsch at Columbia University.

References

External links
 Official website

Yale School of Medicine
Neuroscience research centers in the United States
Medical research institutes in the United States
Research institutes in Connecticut